Dakoro  is a department or commune of Léraba Province in south-western  Burkina Faso. Its capital lies at the town of Dakoro. According to the 1996 census the department has a total population of 12,864.

Towns and villages
 Dakoro	(7 121 inhabitants) (capital)
 Diérisso	(829 inhabitants)
 Lemagara	(833 inhabitants)
 Moadougou	(1 883 inhabitants)
 Kasseguera	(2 198 inhabitants)

References

Departments of Burkina Faso
Léraba Province